The 1948 NCAA Wrestling Championships were the 18th NCAA Wrestling Championships to be held. Lehigh in Bethlehem, Pennsylvania hosted the tournament at Taylor Gymnasium.

Oklahoma A&M took home the team championship with 33 points and having two individual champions.

Bill Koll of Iowa State Teachers College was named the Outstanding Wrestler.

Team results

Individual finals

References 

NCAA Division I Wrestling Championship
Wrestling competitions in the United States
1948 in American sports
1948 in sports in Pennsylvania
Wrestling in Pennsylvania